Eastern Baseball Stadium is a baseball stadium located on the campus of Eastern Connecticut State University in Willimantic, Connecticut, United States.

The stadium played opened in 1998.  It has a seating capacity of 1,500.  Its primary tenant is the Eastern Connecticut State University college baseball team.  The stadium has also hosted several NCAA Division III regional baseball tournaments and was home to the collegiate summer Thread City Tides from 1998 to 2003.

References

External links
 Video tour of the stadium

Sports venues in Connecticut
New England Collegiate Baseball League ballparks